Cross-country skiing at the 2007 Winter Universiade included ten cross-country skiing events.

Medal table

Men's events

10km Classical Individual

Women's events

5km Classical Individual

References 

2007 Winter Universiade
Winter Universiade
2007